2020 ARCA Menards Series may refer to:
 2020 ARCA Menards Series, the national division
 2020 ARCA Menards Series East, a series that races in the eastern United States
 2020 ARCA Menards Series West, a series that races in the western United States